Steve Sims (born 1966) is the founder and CEO of the luxury concierge service Bluefish. In 2017, Sims published a book, Bluefishing: The Art of Making Things Happen. Sims grew up in East London and met his wife, Clare, when he was 16 years old.

Career
Sims began his career as a Bricklayer in London. In 1980, Sims started a stockbroker job in London, where he worked for about 6 months. Eventually, Sims transferred to Hong Kong where he was fired in 5 days. After losing his stockbroking job, Sims stayed in Hong Kong where he worked as a Doorman for a Night Club in the area, where he went to parties and met their attendees, forming the network that would initially support Bluefish. Sims has arranged many adventures for clients including:
 Private Dinner for 6 at the Feet of Michelangelo's David
 Dinners in Italy while being Serenaded by Andrea Bocelli
 Underwater Tours of the Titanic Through Bluefin, Sims has networked and befriended many powerful people including: Donald Trump, Sting, Andrea Bocelli and Elon Musk. In 2016, Sims landed a publishing deal with Simon & Schuster for his book, "Bluefish: The Art of Making Things Happen". Sims current project features an app called Taste of Blue that offers a more accessible route to unique and luxury outcomes. Sims has been featured in over 30 TV shows, over 60 major publications, and has spoken at many events including Harvard.

Bluefish 
Sims founded Bluefish in 1996. In 2003, Bluefish partnered with MBNA to launch its own credit card. In 2004, Bluefish was named the official concierge of L.A. and New York Fashion Weeks. In August 2006, Icon International Holdings Inc. signed an agreement with Bluefish Concierge to provide all concierge services for the airline and its travelers. Bluefish Concierge was the official concierge of the Kentucky Derby from 2005 to 2007.

Education and Personal Details
Steve Sims did not attend college, and dropped out of school at the age of 15. Sims currently lives in Los Angeles with his wife, Clare, their 3 children, and their dog.

References

External links
The Bluefish
Steve Sims
Sims Distillery 
Taste of BLUE

1966 births
21st-century American businesspeople
Living people
Place of birth missing (living people)